The enzyme 4-carboxymuconolactone decarboxylase catalyzes the chemical reaction

2-carboxy-2,5-dihydro-5-oxofuran-2-acetate  4,5-dihydro-5-oxofuran-2-acetate + CO2

This enzyme belongs to the family of lyases, specifically the carboxy-lyases, which cleave carbon-carbon bonds.  The systematic name of this enzyme class is 2-carboxy-2,5-dihydro-5-oxofuran-2-acetate carboxy-lyase (4,5-dihydro-5-oxofuran-2-acetate-forming). Other names in common use include gamma-4-carboxymuconolactone decarboxylase, and 4-carboxymuconolactone carboxy-lyase.  This enzyme participates in benzoate degradation via hydroxylation.

Structural studies

As of late 2007, only one structure has been solved for this class of enzymes, with the PDB accession code .

References 

 
 

EC 4.1.1
Enzymes of known structure